Colonel Cole Christian Kingseed, Ph.D. (Ret.) is an Army veteran, military historian, author, consultant, and professor. He is the author of The New York Times bestseller, Beyond Band of Brothers: The War Memoirs of Major Dick Winters. Kingseed, a 30-year army veteran, served as a Full Professor of History and Chief of Military History at the United States Military Academy at West Point.

Education
Kingseed graduated from the University of Dayton (OH) in 1971 with his Bachelor of Arts degree. He later earned his Master's degree and Ph.D. in history from Ohio State University.  He also holds a Master of Arts Degree in National Security and Strategic Studies from the US Naval War College.

Career
Throughout his thirty-year career in the US Army, Kingseed served in various command and staff positions.

Kingseed was granted tenure at the US Military Academy at West Point as Professor Emeritus of History and Chief of Military History. He served as Chief of Military History for four years.

As an historian and author, Kingseed has written more than fifty articles on leadership and 300 book reviews. He has also written and edited six books. A trusted expert on military history, he appeared on the History Channel in documentaries for George S. Patton and Douglas MacArthur. Kingseed, who co-wrote the war memoirs of Major Dick Winters with Winters, organized a memorial service for him when he died.

In 2009, he was awarded the Army Historical Foundation's Distinguished Writing Award for his article on US Army leadership during World War II.

Currently, Kingseed is the founding partner and consulting historian for Battlefield Leadership.  Kingseed is also the President of The Brecourt Leadership Experience, Inc., a leadership consulting firm. Its clients include General Electric, Freddie Mac, International Paper, and Bayer Corporation.

In May 2016, Kingseed was a commencement speaker at The Citadel and received an honorary Doctor of Letters degree.

Personal life
Kingseed lives in Cornwall-on-Hudson, New York with his family.

Published work
Books
Conversations with Major Dick Winters;  
Beyond Band of Brothers: The War Memoirs of Major Dick Winters; 2006;  
Old Glory Stories: American Combat Leadership in WWII; 2006; 
From Omaha Beach to Dawson's Ridge; 2005;  The American Civil War; 2004; Eisenhower and the Suez Crisis of 1956''; 1995;

External links
Cole C. Kingseed: Old Glory Stories: American Combat Leadership in World War II 
A Case Study in Disaster for Tomorrow's Generals 
Marshall's Men by Cole C. Kingseed 
America in WWII: Genuine Legend, Genuine Man by Cole C. Kingseed

References

1949 births
Living people
University of Dayton alumni
Ohio State University alumni
Naval War College alumni
United States Army colonels
United States Military Academy faculty
21st-century American historians
21st-century American male writers
American male non-fiction writers
Historians from Ohio